Jon Petter Ekstrand (born 14 December 1976) is a Swedish composer and film sound designer. As a composer, he has collaborated with director Daniel Espinosa scoring films such as Easy Money, Child 44, Life, and Morbius. Since 1999, he has worked and contributed as a composer or a sound designer on several films, television films, TV series and short films, including music for 4 episodes of the Swedish TV series Sebastian Bergman.

Career 
While studying at the Stockholm Film School, Ekstrand was a Tilliander scholar. His first work as a composer was the Danish short film The Fighter (2003) directed by Daniel Espinosa. Since then they have collaborated on several films, including Babylon Disease (2004), Outside Love (2007), Easy Money (2010), Child 44 (2015), Life (2017) and Morbius (2022).

Filmography

As composer 
English language

Other languages

Television

References

External links 
 
 

1976 births
Swedish film score composers
Male film score composers
Sound editors
Living people
People from Tumba, Sweden